Galtonia is a genus of plants in the family Asparagaceae, subfamily Scilloideae. Native to Southern Africa, the genus is named after Sir Francis Galton. According to some authorities it has been subsumed into Ornithogalum as a subgenus, while others prefer to keep it as a separate genus.

Description 
These are large, vigorous perennial bulbous geophytes, with numerous wide (>5 cm) and large tapering glabrous leaves that ascend and sheathe the stem. The inflorescences are racemose, and conical or cylindrical, but sometimes corymbose. They bear nodding (rarely erect) flowers with fleshy white or greenish yellow tepals that are fused (rarely free) into a campanulate (bell like) tube that extends about half the length of the flower, but are never fragrant. The bracts are membranous and linear-acuminate, while bracteoles are absent. The pedicels are patent The  Stamens, which are hidden amongst the perianth lobes where they are inserted at the base have ovate-acuminate (oval, tapering to a point at one end) filaments that are cylindrical and adnate to the perianth tube, merged at its end (occasionally free). The ovary may be black, green or yellow and or ovoid or cylindrical. The style is filiform (thread like) and white, with a stigma  that is glandular and somewhat trilobed.

The fruit capsule is lanceolate, cylindrical or ovate and acute, and wider in its basal third. The capsule is triangular in section with blunt edges and bears seeds that are large and polygonal or irregularly flattened and biseriate. The seed testa is engraved into a puzzle like pattern. The globose bulbs have soft membranous tunics. Chromosome numbers: 2n=16 (12, 14 in G. saundersiae).

Taxonomy 
Galtonia was first described as a new genus within Liliaceae in 1880 by Joseph Decaisne, and appeared the following year in the 1881 Kew Gardens report. He describes two species, G. candicans (Hyacinthus candicans Baker) and G. princeps (Hyacinthus princeps Baker), which are listed in an 1884 text. These were reassignments of two of Baker's species of Hyacinthus, which he distinguished as sufficiently different to justify forming a new genus, with G. candicans the type species.

By the 1870s, as Baker describes in his revision of the family, the taxonomy of Liliaceae had become vast and complicated. Baker had placed the two species of Galtonia, which at that time he considered to be Hyacinthus in the tribe Hyacintheae, one of eight tribes that he divided the Liliaceae into. Later in the 1880s, Galtonia with its two species was included as a district and separate genus in two influential taxonomic systems. In the United Kingdom Bentham and Hooker published their volume on the Liliaceae in Latin in 1883. Bentham and Hooker divided it into 20 tribes and placed Galtonia in the tribe Scilleae with 19 other genera. In the German literature the taxonomic system of Engler completed its classification of Liliaceae in 1888. He divided the family into twelve subfamilies and subordinate tribes. Galtonia was then placed in the subfamily Lilioideae and tribe Scilleae together with 21 other genera. 

In 1955 a third species, G. viridiflora, was described, followed by G. regalis in 1986. For a graphical history of its circumscription, see Manning et al. 2009 Table 1. and Martinez-Azorin et al. Table 2. Various efforts were made during the twentieth century to dismember the Liliaceae, culminating in the separation of the higher orders, Asparagales and Liliales, and the emergence of Asparagaceae as a separate family, in which the Scilleae, including Galtonia, were now the Scilloideae   subfamily. Galtonia is one of the genera in the tribe Ornithogaleae, the largest tribe within the subfamily Scilloideae. Historically it was treated as part of the subfamily Ornithogaloideae of Hyacinthaceae, now obsolete terms. The preferred treatment being to consider the Hyacinthaceae as subfamily Scilloideae of Asparagaceae. The original subfamilies within Hyacinthaceae becoming tribes of subfamily Scilloideae. Thus subfamily Ornithogaloideae became tribe Ornithogaleae. The precise taxonomy of the Ornithogaloideae/Ornithogaleae has been problematic since at least the time of Linnaeus.

Phylogenetics 
Phylogenetic analysis utilising plastid gene sequencing (trnL-F) brought some new clarity to the complex and controversial taxonomy of subfamily Scilloideae, with Pfosser and Speta (1999) demonstrating that the Ornithogaloideae/Ornithogaleae were one of four major clades within the subfamily. This clade also demonstrated two subclades, Ornithogaleae and Dipcadieae (which included Galtonia). Further work by Manning et al. did not support the concept of these subclades and subsumed all of the subfamily Scilloideae into the genus Ornithogalum with about 300 species. At the same time they pointed out the historical importance of Galtonia and its distinct floral characteristics and horticultural importance. In considering the circumscription of Galtonia, they pointed out that the genus was paraphyletic unless it included Ornithogalum saundersiae, but to include it created problems of morphological circumscription.

This sensu lato reduction of Speta's fourteen genera into one was not widely accepted, even though they were polyphyletic, and had a number of problems. (This also had the effect of eliminating Galtonia as a genus, under which a number of Ornithogalum species are still sold.)

Further analysis with wider sampling (70 compared to 40 taxa) and an additional plastid region (matK) revealed the presence of three clades (A, B and C) within Ornithogaleae/Ornithogalum. Consequently, a new classification was proposed with three tribes and four genera, Ornithogalum corresponding to Clade C, was placed in tribe Ornithogaleae, but further subdivided into four subgenera and further sections, with 160 species. Thus three of Speta's other thirteen genera were resurrected. Galtonia on the other hand was retained as a taxon but as a subgenus of Ornithogalum with seven species.

Subsequently, an alternative approach was suggested combining plastid gene sequences with nuclear DNA sequences, morphology and biogeography. This supported Manning et al.'''s Clade C within which Ornithogalum was contained, but the very large subgenus Ornithogalum was noted to still be heterogeneous, an issue which those authors had managed by treating the subgenus in seven sections. In contrast Martinez-Azorin et al. suggested reversing the sensu lato (lumping) approach of Manning et al., reverting to separate genera (splitting), thus resurrecting Galtonia and eighteen other genera.

As of April 2015 the sensu lato approach of Manning et al. (2009) is still in use by the World Checklist of Selected Plant Families.

 Subdivision 
Manning et al. (2009) reconstructed Galtonia as a subgenus of Ornithogalum,  but with two sections and a type species of O. candicans;
 section Xanthochlora (U. Müll.-Doblies & D. Müll.-Doblies) J.C. Manning & Goldblatt (2 species; type O. xanthochlorum)
 section Galtonia (Decne) J.C. Manning & Goldblatt (5 species; type O. candicans)

 Species 
The number of species has varied from four to seven.

The traditional four species were;
 Galtonia candicans (Baker) Decne. 
 Galtonia princeps (Baker) Decne. 
 Galtonia regalis Hilliard & B.L.Burtt
 Galtonia viridiflora Verdoorn.

and these were transferred to Ornithogalum by Manning et al. (2004). When reconstructed as a subgenus there were seven species;
 section Xanthochlora 
 Ornithogalum haalenbergense U. Müll.-Doblies & D. Müll.-Doblies.
 Ornithogalum xanthochlorum Baker
 section Galtonia Ornithogalum candicans (Baker) J.C. Manning & Goldblatt
 Ornithogalum princeps (Baker) J.C. Manning & Goldblatt
 Ornithogalum regale (Hilliard & B.L. Burtt) J.C. Manning & Goldblatt
 Ornithogalum saundersiae Baker
 Ornithogalum viridiflorum (I. Verd.) J.C. Manning & Goldblatt

In the system of Martinez-Azorin et al. (2011) the original four species (Galtonia sensu stricto) are maintained, together with Galtonia saundersiae (Baker) Mart.-Azorín, M.B.Crespo & Juan as the fifth species, while the two species of section Xanthochlora, a sister clade, are transferred to a separate genus— Ethesia.

As of April 2015 The World Checklist of Selected Plant Families lists six species with their preferred synonyms;Galtonia candicans  = Ornithogalum candicans Galtonia clavata Baker ex Mast. = Pseudogaltonia clavata (Baker ex Mast.) E.PhillipsGaltonia princeps  =  Ornithogalum princeps Galtonia regalis  =  Ornithogalum regale Galtonia saundersiae  = Ornithogalum saundersiae Galtonia viridiflora  = Ornithogalum viridiflorum Etymology 
The genus Galtonia was named by Decaisne after Sir Francis Galton, who had published his account of his travels in South Africa.

 Distribution and habitat 
The species of Galtonia sensu stricto are distributed in the high precipitation summer rainfall, high-altitude areas of the Drakensberg, Low Drakensberg, Southern Berg and  Natal Midlands of the eastern provinces of South Africa (KwaZulu-Natal, Free State, Mpumalanga and Eastern Cape) and Lesotho.

 Uses Galtonia viridiflora with its pale green flowers, and the white flowered Galtonia candicans or Cape Hyacinth are sold as ornamental garden plants, usually as Galtonia, while Galtonia saundersiae is more commonly listed as Ornithogalum''.

See also 
Taxonomy of Liliaceae

Notes

References

Bibliography 

 
 
 
 
 
 
 
 
 
 
  In

Historical sources

Databases

Searches 
 Galtonia at Biodiversity Heritage Library

Scilloideae
Asparagaceae genera